Lüke is a German language surname that stems from the male given name Ludwig. Notable people with the name include:
Jan Lüke (1989), German lightweight rower
Josef Lüke (1899–1948), German international footballer

German-language surnames
Surnames from given names